The 1897 Svenska Mästerskapet was the second season of Svenska Mästerskapet, the football Cup to determine the Swedish champions. Örgryte IS won the tournament by defeating its reserve team Örgryte IS II in the final with a 1–0 score.

Final

References 

Print

1897
Mas
Svenska